Georgetown Executive Airport is in Williamson County, Texas, three miles north of Georgetown. The FAA's National Plan of Integrated Airport Systems for 2007–2011 categorized it as a reliever airport.

Most U.S. airports use the same three-letter location identifier for the FAA and IATA, but this airport is GTU to the FAA and has no IATA code.

Facilities
It has two asphalt runways: 11/29 is 4,100 by 75 feet (1,250 x 23 m) and 18/36 is 5,000 by 100 feet (1,524 x 30 m).

In the year ending February 27, 2008 the airport had 127,700 aircraft operations, average 350 per day: 98% general aviation, 1% air taxi and 1% military. 216 aircraft were then based at the airport: 84% single-engine, 12% multi-engine, 3% jet, 1% helicopters.

Incidents
On February 18, 2010 Andrew Joseph Stack flew a Piper Cherokee from Georgetown Municipal Airport into the Internal Revenue Service building in Austin, Texas. This suicide attack killed one IRS employee and Stack himself.

References

External links 

 Aerial photo as of 2 February 1995 from USGS The National Map
 
 

Airports in Texas
Buildings and structures in Williamson County, Texas
Transportation in Williamson County, Texas
Airports in Greater Austin